Tommy Earl Blake, Jr. (born January 15, 1985) is a former American football defensive end who played college football at Texas Christian University.

Early life

Blake grew up in a tiny town in Texas. At just 10 months old his mother died of pneumonia. He was taken care of by his maternal grandmother, Ernestine Chisholm. Blake became a devout Baptist and a mama's boy.

Blake was a standout athlete at Aransas Pass High School, earning 12 total letters (four in basketball, four in track, three in football and one in baseball). He played running back for the Panthers, as a senior ran for 2,101 yards and 25 touchdowns behind a stout offensive line led by an all-South Texas center. This performance earned him All-South Texas Offensive MVP honors from the Corpus Christi Caller-Times. He was offered football scholarships at Colorado, Arkansas, and Vanderbilt, but elected to stay closer to home to play at TCU in Fort Worth. Blake played on Aransas Pass High School's championship basketball teams, playing all four years on the varsity, and advancing to the UIL Texas State Playoffs all four years. The Panthers basketball team advanced to the class AAA Boy's Final Four his junior and senior years with Blake at the center position. Blake was named first-team All State in basketball his senior year.

College career

While redshirting as a freshman in 2003, Blake was moved by TCU coach Gary Patterson from tailback to defensive end because of his mix of size and speed. As a redshirt freshman in 2004, Blake earned Conference USA All-Freshman honors with five sacks, the most for a TCU freshman since Aaron Schobel in 1997. In 2005, TCU moved to the Mountain West Conference, and Blake earned first-team All-MWC honors with seven sacks and 13.5 tackles for loss. College Football News named Blake their Mountain West Defensive Player of the Year.

Before his junior season in 2006, Blake was named a preseason All-American by The Sporting News. He also appeared on the watch lists for the Bronko Nagurski Trophy, the Chuck Bednarik Award, the Lombardi Award, the Ted Hendricks Award, and the Lott Trophy.

During his junior season, Blake led the Horned Frogs with 54 tackles, 16 tackles for loss and seven sacks. He also returned a fumble for a touchdown against UNLV. He was again named first-team All-MWC, this time as a unanimous choice. On December 19, Blake and his TCU team took on Northern Illinois in the Poinsettia Bowl. NIU was led by senior running back Garrett Wolfe, who led the nation in rushing with 1,900 yards coming into the game, but was held to just 20 yards by the TCU defense.

College football's mystery man

Heading into his senior year, Blake was named to the watch lists for both the Lombardi and Lott awards once again. He rose into the top five on some early 2008 NFL Draft boards and drew wide comparisons to Dwight Freeney for his burst off the ball and his straight-line speed. Dave Campbell's Texas Football featured Blake on its 2007 cover alongside Texas A&M quarterback Stephen McGee and Texas quarterback Colt McCoy.

Blake bolted the team on August 16, 2007, though, and wound up missing five games with an undisclosed leave of absence that no one at TCU seemed to want to discuss. When he returned to the field for the final four games of the regular season, he did not appear ready to play; he appeared overweight and at times visibly uninterested. His draft stock plummeted. Further, he played slow, collecting only four sacks and eight tackles for a loss among 21 total tackles. Following the regular season, he was invited to the East-West Shrine Game and checked in at 287 pounds. He played as a junior in the 255-260 range.

After extended speculation during the 2007 NCAA Division I FBS football season, Blake's agent Reggie Rouzan revealed in February 2008 that Blake was being treated for depression and social anxiety disorder, which privacy laws had prohibited TCU from disclosing publicly. The daily presence of scouts was reported as what drove Blake off that practice field, but Blake believes what he estimates to be around 300 daily calls from prospective scouts brought about his mental illness.

Initially, he did not seek professional help for his problems during his sabbatical from the team, and instead spent his time in Aransas Pass eating and watching television with his family. More recently, and upon TCU head coach Gary Patterson's insistence, Blake has attended counseling sessions and begun taking medication.

Instead of attending the NFL Scouting Combine, Blake underwent several psychological tests in a nearby Indianapolis hospital on February 24, 2008. He took his first metaphorical step toward rebuilding his NFL draft stock at TCU's pro day Thursday March 6, 2008, when he showed up weighing 272 pounds and ran a hand-held time of 4.75 in the 40-yard dash, the same time run by top defensive end prospect Chris Long of the University of Virginia. He also had 23 reps in the 225-pound bench press, better than the University of Miami's Calais Campbell's 16 reps or Clemson's Phillip Merling's 17, and logged a 30-inch vertical jump and a broad jump of 9 ft, 3 in. He was not drafted in the 2008 NFL draft and attended the Tampa Bay Buccaneers' minicamp as a free agent.

External links
Official TCU Profile

References

1985 births
Living people
American football defensive ends
TCU Horned Frogs football players
People with mood disorders
People from Aransas Pass, Texas